Interstate 205 may refer to either of two unconnected Interstate Highways in the United States, both of which are related to Interstate 5

 Interstate 205 (California), a connector in the San Francisco Bay Area
 Interstate 205 (Oregon–Washington), a bypass of Portland, Oregon

05-2
2